Half a Lifelong Romance (半生緣) is a Chinese novel by Eileen Chang. It was initially serialized on a Shanghai newspaper Yi Bao (亦報) in 1948, under the title Eighteen Springs (十八春). The novel was published as a book in 1950. In 1966, Chang edited the book in the United States and republished it under the title Half a Lifelong Romance in Taiwan.

The novel was under the heavy influence of John P. Marquand's work, H. M. Pulham Esq. Chang transplanted and adapted the synopsis, character settings, important scenes, and dialogues from Marquand's work.

The novel was translated to English in 2014 by Karen S. Kingsbury.

Adaptations
Eighteen Springs, a 1997 Hong Kong film
Affair of Half a Lifetime, a 2002 Chinese TV series
Half a Lifelong Romance (a.k.a. Eighteen Springs), a 2020 Chinese TV series

1948 American novels
Novels by Eileen Chang
20th-century Chinese novels
Chinese novels adapted into films
Chinese novels adapted into television series
Chinese Republican era novels
Novels set in Shanghai
American novels adapted into films
Novels set in Nanjing